The Convention on the Reduction of Cases of Multiple Nationality and on Military Obligations in Cases of Multiple Nationality is a convention signed in 1963 by the Council of Europe with the stated aim of reducing cases of multiple nationalities.

Background 
The Convention aims to reduce as far as possible the number of cases of multiple nationality, as between Parties. It contains 2 chapters:
 Chapter I, "Reduction of cases of multiple nationality", lays down rules to reduce cases of multiple nationality in the case of the acquisition of a new nationality or the renunciation of one nationality, and the legal consequences for persons concerned, including minor persons.
 Chapter II contains provisions on "Military obligations in cases of multiple nationality".

The convention came into force in 1968 following the ratification by Italy, the second state, after France.

Signatories, ratifications and renunciations 
, 15 of the 47 states of Europe have signed the convention, 13 of whom went on to ratify it with five choosing to denounce it (or partially denounce it) between 2000 and 2011. Denunciations by a party enter into force one year after the denunciation itself.

According to the Italian Government (the most recent to denounce chapter I of the Convention): "The Italian government's denunciation of the 1963 Strasbourg Convention means that, as from June 4, 2010, Italian citizenship is no longer automatically lost for the Italians who become naturalised citizens of the countries signatories to that Convention."

Following the (partial) denunciations of many countries, the full treaty - including chapter I - is only in force for Austria and the Netherlands.

References 

Council of Europe treaties
1963 in law